Ernests Gūtmanis (born 15 January 1901, date of death unknown) was a Latvian boxer who competed in the 1924 Summer Olympics. In 1924 he was eliminated in the first round of the lightweight class after losing his fight to Jorge Nicolares.

References

External links
 
 

1901 births
Year of death missing
Lightweight boxers
Olympic boxers of Latvia
Boxers at the 1924 Summer Olympics
Latvian male boxers
20th-century Latvian people